Catharina Egges (1750 - 1824), was a Dutch publisher. Between 1781 and 1824, she managed the publishing company Algemeene bibliotheek.

See also
 List of women printers and publishers before 1800

References 
Myriam Everard, Egges, Catharina, in: Digitaal Vrouwenlexicon van Nederland. URL: https://web.archive.org/web/20180421030719/http://resources.huygens.knaw.nl/vrouwenlexicon/lemmata/data/Egges [13/01/2014] 

1750 births
1824 deaths
18th-century Dutch businesspeople
19th-century Dutch businesspeople
18th-century publishers (people)
19th-century publishers (people)
18th-century Dutch businesswomen
19th-century Dutch businesswomen